Buck Pond is a small lake north-northwest of the hamlet of North Wilmurt in Herkimer County, New York. It drains south via an unnamed creek that flows into Woodhull Creek.

See also
 List of lakes in New York

References 

Lakes of New York (state)
Lakes of Herkimer County, New York